Little Lake Cemetery is a non-denominational cemetery located in Peterborough, Ontario, Canada. It opened in 1850 and is located on the southern shore of Little Lake.

History
Founded in 1850 as a private trust cemetery with a public mandate, Little Lake Cemetery was the first community non-profit cemetery in Canada West. Prior to its establishment, the people of Peterborough buried their dead in the middle of town where Peterborough Collegiate now stands. This downtown cemetery was closed in 1854. The cemetery was surveyed by F.F. Passmore, with the assistance of Sandford Fleming. 

The chapel was constructed in the Carpenter Gothic style in 1877 by Alfred Belcher, brother of John E. Belcher. Some argued the construction of a chapel went against the non-denominational character of the cemetery, but it is largely a decorative landmark and a convenience during inclement weather.

Notable internments
Notable internments in Little Lake Cemetery include:
 John E. Belcher (1834–1915), architect and engineer 
 John Bertram (1837–1904), Member of Parliament for Peterborough West (1872–1878)
 Frank Buckland (1902–1991), ice hockey administrator
 Isabella Valancy Crawford (1846–1887), writer and poet
 Iva Campbell Fallis (1883–1956), second female Canadian senator
 H. E. T. Haultain (1869–1961), engineer and inventor
 Henry Rowe Hocking Kenner (1867–1944), educator
 Colleen Peterson (1950–1996), country and folk singer
 Richard Birdsall Rogers (1857–1927), engineer known for the Peterborough Lift Lock

References

Buildings and structures in Peterborough, Ontario
Carpenter Gothic architecture in Canada
Cemeteries in Ontario
1850 establishments in Ontario